Po Saong Nyung Ceng (?–1822), also known as Po Ceng or Po Saong Nhung Cheng, was the ruler of Champa from 1799 to 1822. His Vietnamese name was Nguyễn Văn Chấn (阮文振).

Po Saong Nyung Ceng joined the Nguyễn army in 1790. In 1794, he was appointed as the viceroy, or the deputy ruler of Champa by Nguyễn Ánh. 

Po Chongchan, the Champa ruler supported by the Tây Sơn dynasty, invaded Băl Canar (present-day Phan Rí Cửa, Tuy Phong District, Bình Thuận Province) in 1796. It was defeated by Po Saong Nyung Ceng. Po Saong Nyung Ceng also took part in putting down the rebellion of Tuan Phaow. 

He succeeded Po Ladhuanpuguh (Nguyễn Văn Hào) as the ruler in 1799. He was succeeded by Po Klan Thu in 1822.

There was a history record about him: Ariya Po Ceng. The record was written in Cham script. It was kept in Société Asiatique de Paris.

References

Kings of Champa
1822 deaths
Year of birth unknown